The Kitimat Ranges are one of the three main subdivisions of the Coast Mountains in British Columbia, Canada, the others being the Pacific Ranges to the south and the Boundary Ranges to the north.

Geography

The Kitimat Ranges lie between the Nass River and Portland Inlet in the north and the Bella Coola River and Burke Channel on the south, and are bounded on their east by the Hazelton Mountains and include the mountainous islands of the North Coastal Archipelago, as well as King Island, which lies between Dean Channel and the aforesaid Burke Channel. Some of those islands are part of a separate formation known as the Coastal Trough.

Although lower than the neighbouring Pacific Ranges to the south, they are in some ways more rugged, and are heavily indented by coastal inlets as well as by fjord-like lake valleys on the Interior side of the range.

Sub-ranges
Bare Top Range
Countess of Dufferin Range
Kitlope Range
North Coastal Archipelago
Bell Range
Burnaby Range
Cape Range
Chismore Range
Murphy Range
Richardson Range
Spiller Range
Williams Range
Wimbledon Range
Tenaiko Range

Parks
Exchamsiks River Provincial Park
Tweedsmuir South Provincial Park
Tweedsmuir North Provincial Park and Protected Area
Kitimat River Provincial Park
Kleanza Creek Provincial Park
Khutzeymateen Grizzly Bear Sanctuary
Nisga'a Memorial Lava Beds Provincial Park
Kitlope Heritage Conservancy

Rivers
Rivers within or originating in, or which transit the Kitimat Ranges, are:
Brim River
Dean River
Ecstall River
Kemano River
Khtada River
Kitimat River
Kitlope River
McNeil River
Scotia River
Skeena River

See also
Mountain ranges of British Columbia
North American Cordillera

References

 
Mountain ranges of British Columbia
North Coast of British Columbia
Coast Mountains